Attack Force is a 1980 video game developed by Big Five Software for the TRS-80 16K. It was written by Big Five co-founders Bill Hogue and Jeff Konyu. Hogue later wrote Miner 2049'er. Attack Force is based on Exidy's 1980 Targ arcade game.

Gameplay
Attack Force is a game in which the player's ship must avoid the twisting and turning ram-ships of the enemy.

Reception
J. Mishcon reviewed Attack Force in The Space Gamer No. 39. Mishcon commented that "This is another strong entry in the Big Five line and I strongly recommend it for any arcade buff."

Reviews
Moves #57, p14

References

External links
Review in Byte
Review in Creative Computing

1980 video games
Big Five Software games
TRS-80 games
TRS-80-only games
Video game clones
Video games developed in the United States